The 2008–09 season was the 2nd season in the Football League played by Dagenham & Redbridge F.C., an English football club based in Dagenham, Greater London. It was their second consecutive season in Football League Two after promotion from the Football Conference in 2007. The season covers the period from 1 July 2008 to 30 June 2009.

Match results
League positions are sourced from Statto, while the remaining contents of each table are sourced from the references in the "Ref" column.

League Two

FA Cup

League Cup

Football League Trophy

Player details

Numbers in parentheses denote appearances as substitute.
Players with names struck through and marked  left the club during the playing season.
Players with names in italics and marked * were on loan from another club for the whole of their season with Dagenham & Redbridge.
Players listed with no appearances have been in the matchday squad but only as unused substitutes.
Key to positions: GK – Goalkeeper; DF – Defender; MF – Midfielder; FW – Forward

References 

Dagenham and Redbridge
Dagenham & Redbridge F.C. seasons